Kerns is a surname. Notable people with the surname include:

 Brian D. Kerns (born 1957), former US representative from Indiana
 George M. Kerns (1871–1941), architect
 Joanna Kerns, (born 1953), American actress and director
 John Kerns, (1923–1988), Canadian football player
 Krayton Kerns (born 1957), Montana state legislator
 Lloyd Kerns (1921–1986) Ohio state legislator
 Sandra Kerns (born 1949), American actress
 Todd Kerns (born 1969), Canadian musician

See also 

 
Kern (surname)